Crescent Beach is an unincorporated census-designated place in St. Johns County, Florida, United States. The population was 985 at the 2000 census.

Geography
Crescent Beach is located at  (29.765550, -81.253023).

Demographics

As of the census of 2000, there were 985 people, 530 households, and 299 families residing in the community. The racial makeup of the community was 97.36% White, 0.10% African American, 0.51% Native American, 0.41% Asian, 0.20% Pacific Islander, and 1.42% from two or more races. Hispanic or Latino of any race were 0.81% of the population.

There were 530 households, out of which 9.4% had children under the age of 18 living with them, 50.8% were married couples living together, 3.2% had a female householder with no husband present, and 43.4% were non-families. 35.3% of all households were made up of individuals, and 16.6% had someone living alone who was 65 years of age or older.  The average household size was 1.86 and the average family size was 2.33.

The population was spread out, with 8.8% under the age of 18, 4.5% from 18 to 24, 17.6% from 25 to 44, 32.8% from 45 to 64, and 36.3% who were 65 years of age or older.  The median age was 57 years. For every 100 females, there were 105.6 males.  For every 100 females age 18 and over, there were 100.4 males.

The median income for a household in the community was $39,821, and the median income for a family was $49,712. Males had a median income of $42,750 versus $29,091 for females. The per capita income for the community was $32,279.  None of the families and 8.9% of the population were living below the poverty line, including no under eighteens and 4.8% of those over 64.

Education
It is in the St. Johns County School District.

Zoned schools include W. D. Hartley Elementary School, Gamble Rogers Middle School, and Pedro Menendez High School.

References

Census-designated places in St. Johns County, Florida
Beaches of St. Johns County, Florida
Census-designated places in the Jacksonville metropolitan area
Census-designated places in Florida
Populated coastal places in Florida on the Atlantic Ocean
Beaches of Florida